Prince Ludwig of Bavaria (22 June 1913 – 17 October 2008) was a member of the Bavarian Royal House of Wittelsbach.

Early life
Prince Ludwig was born at Nymphenburg Palace, Munich, Kingdom of Bavaria. He was the eldest son of Prince Franz of Bavaria, and his wife Princess Isabella Antonie of Croÿ. After graduating from the Maximilians-Gymnasium (located in Schwabing, Munich), Ludwig studied forestry at the university in Hungary. In 1939, as most young German men of his age, he was drafted into the military, serving as a Gebirgsjäger. However, his career in the German Army was short lived. In early 1941, Ludwig was relieved from all combat duties as a result of the Prinzenerlass which prohibited members of Germany's royal houses from participating in military operations. He spent the rest of the war at Sarvar in Hungary where his family owned a castle.  In 1945, his family fled Hungary and settled at Leutstetten near Starnberg in Bavaria.

Marriage and issue
On 19 July 1950, Ludwig married his first cousin Princess Irmingard of Bavaria (29 May 1923 in Berchtesgaden – 23 October 2010 in Leutstetten), daughter of Crown Prince Rupprecht of Bavaria and Princess Antonia of Luxembourg. The civil wedding took place at Leutstetten, and the religious ceremony followed a day later at Schloss Nymphenburg in Munich. The couple had three children, five grandchildren and four great-grandchildren: 
 Prince Luitpold of Bavaria (born 14 April 1951 in Leutstetten), married on 25 June 1979 in Starnberg, morganatic until 13 March 1999 on the condition of their issue marrying dinastically, Katrin Beatrix Wiegand (born 19 September 1951 in Munich), daughter of Gerd Wiegand (Cottbus, Pomerania, Prussia, Germany, 1922 + Munich, Bavaria, Germany, 1994), architect, married secondly to Frauke Sinjen (Germany, 1940/1941 - Germany, 4 July 2003), actress, and first wife Ellen Schumacher, and had: 
 Princess Auguste Marie Philippa of Bavaria (born Landsberg am Lech, 11 October 1979), married civilly in Bourail, New Caledonia, France, on 26 December 2009 and religiously in Kloster Andechs on 5 June 2010 Prince Ferdinand Clemens Christian zur Lippe-Weissenfeld (born Detmold, 5 September 1976), 
 Princess Alice Isabelle Marie of Bavaria (born Landsberg am Lech, 25 June 1981), married civilly in Karlstetten on 20 June 2009 and religiously in Kloster Andechs on 29 August 2009 Prince Lukas Christophe Maria Gubertus of Auersperg (born St. Pölten, 27 August 1981), had issue
 Prince Ludwig Heinrich of Bavaria (born Landsberg am Lech, 14 June 1982)
 Prince Heinrich Rudolf of Bavaria (born Landsberg am Lech, 23 January 1986), married morganatically in Kloster Andechs on 22 April 2017 Henriette Gruse
 Prince Karl Rupprecht of Bavaria (born Munich, 10 March 1987)
 Princess Maria of Bavaria (born and died 3 January 1953 in Leutstetten)
 Princess Philippa of Bavaria (born and died 26 June 1954 in Leutstetten)

Later life
After the death of Crown Prince Rupprecht of Bavaria in 1955, Ludwig and Irmingard moved into Schloss Leutstetten, where Irmingard continued to live. Ludwig was a Grand Prior of the Bavarian Order of Saint George, a Knight of the Order of Saint Hubert, and from 1960 a Knight of the Order of the Golden Fleece.

Ludwig died of pneumonia at Schloss Leutstetten,  17 October 2008, at the age of 95.
On Wednesday,  22 October at 10:00 a.m., a Funeral Liturgy was held in the abbey church at Andechs.  After the Mass,  his body was buried in the Wittelsbach cemetery on the abbey grounds.

Ancestry

References
 Adalbert Prinz von Bayern. Die Wittelsbacher: Geschichte unserer Familie. München: Prestel Verlag, 1979.

Notes

House of Wittelsbach
People from the Kingdom of Bavaria
Princes of Bavaria
Knights of the Golden Fleece of Austria
1913 births
2008 deaths
Burials at Andechs Abbey